Mithuna quadriplaga is a moth in the subfamily Arctiinae first described by Frederic Moore in 1878. It is found in Bhutan and the Indian state of Sikkim.

References

Moths described in 1878
Lithosiini